Dean-Carlo Manibog (born 28 June 1968) is a Filipino wrestler. He competed in the men's freestyle 68 kg at the 1988 Summer Olympics.

References

External links
 

1968 births
Living people
Filipino male sport wrestlers
Olympic wrestlers of the Philippines
Wrestlers at the 1988 Summer Olympics
Place of birth missing (living people)